Morelli is an Italian surname. Notable people with the surname include:

Anthony Morelli (born 1985), former American football quarterback
Anthony Morelli (born 1968), American blogger
Antonio Morelli (1904-1974), orchestra leader for the Sands Hotel Copa Room from 1954 through 1971
Cosimo Morelli (1732–1812), Italian architect, exponent of neoclassical architecture
Domenico Morelli (1823–1901), Italian painter
Eugenio Morelli (born 1946), Italian physician, poet, writer, essayist and art critic
François Morelli (1833–92), French shipowner and politician
Francesco Morelli (ca. 1767 – ca. 1830), French-Italian painter and engraver
Gabriele Morelli (born 1996), Italian footballer
Giampaolo Morelli (born 1974), Italian actor, director, and screenwriter
Giovanni Morelli, Italian art critic and political figure
Jack Morelli or John Morelli (born 1962), American comic book letterer and author
Laura Morelli, American art historian 
Lazzaro Morelli, Italian sculptor of the Baroque period
Leano Morelli, Italian singer-songwriter 
Lorenzo Morelli (born 1988), Italian footballer
Luca Morelli (born 1987), Italian motorcycle racer
Mario Rosario Morelli (born 1941), Italian judge
Óscar Morelli, born Oscar Bonfiglio Mouet (1936–2005, Mexican actor
Pete Morelli (born 1951), American football official in the National Football League
Rina Morelli (1908-1976), Italian actress
Tony Morelli (1956-2015), Canadian stuntman and martial artist

See also
Morelli (company), Italian coachbuilding firm
Dodici Morelli, sometimes called XII Morelli, municipality of Cento in the Province of Ferrara, Italy
Morelli House, historic home of Sands Hotel band leader and musical conductor Antonio Morelli

Italian-language surnames